Four-Sided Pyramid is a  conceptual modular "structure", by Sol LeWitt, in the National Gallery of Art Sculpture Garden.

The artist created a plan and Four-Sided Pyramid was constructed by others, in 1999.

See also
 List of public art in Washington, D.C., Ward 2

References

Outdoor sculptures in Washington, D.C.
1999 sculptures
Collections of the National Gallery of Art
Concrete sculptures in Washington, D.C.
National Gallery of Art Sculpture Garden
1999 establishments in Washington, D.C.